"Don't Need Love" is a song by English musicians 220 Kid and Gracey, released on 13 December 2019 on Polydor Records. The song peaked at number 9 on the UK Singles Chart in 2020. The song is included on Gracey's debut mini-album, The Art of Closure (2020). Commercially successful in the UK, the song has been certified Platinum by the British Phonographic Industry and received a nomination for Song of the Year at the 41st Brit Awards.

Charts

Weekly charts

Year-end charts

Certifications

See also
 List of top 10 singles in 2020 (Ireland)
 List of Platinum singles in the United Kingdom awarded since 2000
 List of UK Dance Singles Chart number ones of 2020
 List of UK top-ten singles in 2020

References

2019 singles
2019 songs
220 Kid songs
Gracey (singer) songs
Songs written by Gracey (singer)
Polydor Records singles